V. P. Oliver (born October 8, 1985 in Northridge, California, United States as Vince Oliver) is an American actor. He played Jimmy Harrison in Aaron Spelling's soap opera Sunset Beach for 46 episodes in 1997.

Later, Oliver played college basketball at UC Davis, from 2005 to 2009. He scored over 1500 points in his 4-year career.

References

External links
 

American male television actors
American male soap opera actors
Living people
1985 births
UC Davis Aggies men's basketball players
Actors from Los Angeles
People from Northridge, Los Angeles